The 2006–07 PBA season was the 32nd season of the Philippine Basketball Association (PBA). The season started September 28 in Guam and began its formal opening on October 1 at the Araneta Coliseum, and ended on July 20. The league started the season with the All-Filipino Conference, now known as the PBA Philippine Cup while the PBA Fiesta Conference, an import laced tournament, ended the season.

Philippine Basketball League team Welcoat Paintmasters became the tenth member of the league after acquiring the franchise from the defunct Shell Turbo Chargers. The Welcoat franchise has been renamed Welcoat Dragons

Opening ceremonies
The season began on October 1 with the Barangay Ginebra Kings defeating the expansion team Welcoat Dragons, 102-69 in the opener.

The muses for the participating teams are as follows:

2006–07 Philippine Cup

Notable events
 On November 19, Red Bull's Enrico Villanueva and Coca-Cola's Joseph Yeo and Mike Gavino had an altercation at the Araneta Coliseum parking lot after the Tigers' loss to Red Bull. After a meeting at Commissioner Noli Eala's office, Yeo and Villanueva mended their ways. Gavino, Allan Salansang (of Coca-Cola) and Manny Ramos (of Red Bull) gave their testimonies. Villanueva and Yeo previously had an altercation at the Ateneo-La Salle Dream Game, in which Villanueva played for Ateneo while Yeo played for La Salle.
 On November 30, Red Bull coach Yeng Guiao and Talk 'N Text team manager Frankie Lim featured in a shouting match as Asi Taulava of Talk 'N Text and Carlo Sharma of Red Bull figured in an altercation, in a game held at Tacloban City. Guiao and Lim were later ejected at the playing court. Guiao and Lim were later suspended for two games.
 The PBA board approved the passing of the "Restricted Trading List (RTL)," a list of one, later two, players that can't be traded for, unless the replacement is also in the RTL. Qualifications for inclusion in the RTL include statistical points, salaries, longevity and marketability of a player. The RTL is designed to prevent one-sided trades, or trades that will favor only one team.
 San Miguel Corporation (SMC) sold all of its shares of Coca-Cola Bottlers Philippines to the Coca-Cola Company for US$590 million. The fate of the Coca-Cola Tigers is in doubt but rumors say that SMC will transfer the Tigers into different subsidiary.
 Air21 Express traded Yancy de Ocampo and Leo Avenido in exchange for Abby Santos, Mark Andaya and two first round picks in 2009 and 2010 to the Talk 'N Text Phone Pals.

Elimination round

Wildcard round

Playoffs

Finals

Finals MVP: Jayjay Helterbrand (Brgy. Ginebra)
Best Player of the Conference: Mark Caguioa (Brgy. Ginebra)

2007 Fiesta Conference

Notable events
The Purefoods Chunkee Giants changed their nickname to the "Purefoods Tender Juicy Giants," a combination of the Chunkee Giants and TJ Hotdogs nicknames they've had.
Twelve out of fifteen players who were selected to the national team were pulled out from their mother teams to begin their training for the upcoming SEABA Championship 2007, a qualifying tournament for the FIBA Asia Championship 2007. As a result, an apprenticeship draft was supposed to be held, but with players from the Philippine Basketball League and the Mindanao Visayas Basketball Association not taking part, the teams were advised to activate players from their respective injured reserve lists.
The playoffs of the conference were supposed to be shortened for the national team but since the players themselves wouldn't participate in the conference, the semifinals was re-extended from a best-of-five series to a best-of-seven series.
The Coca-Cola Tigers and Coca-Cola Bottlers Philippines were sold by the San Miguel Corporation to the Coca-Cola Company. The Atlanta-based company honored the existing contracts of the team, except for team manager Allan Caidic who voluntarily left the team.
Former commissioner Jun Bernardino died as he suffered a heart attack; all teams were to wear black bands in the duration of the conference.
The Sta. Lucia Realtors dealt Kenneth Duremdes, Alex Cabagnot and Ricky Calimag to the Coca-Cola Tigers in exchange for Dennis Miranda, Manny Ramos and Coca-Cola’s second round draft pick next year.
After negotiations at Ratchaburi, Thailand, Red Bull Barako traded Enrico Villanueva for Rommel Adducul of the San Miguel Beermen. Prior to this, Pennisi replaced Villanueva in Red Bull's restricted trade list in order for the trade to push through.
The Purefoods Chunkee Giants then traded Don Camaso and a second-round pick in either the 2007 PBA Draft or the 2008 PBA Draft for Adducul. This was criticized by PBA insider Ronnie Nathanielsz saying the league was being used "as a business enterprise not to promote its products but to make money selling players" that would lessen the competitive balance between teams.

Elimination round

Playoffs

Finals

|}
Finals MVP: Willie Miller
Best Player of the Conference: Mark Cardona (Talk 'N Text)
Best Import of the Conference: Rossel Ellis (Alaska)

2007 All-Star Weekend

The 2007 PBA All-Star Weekend was held at San Fernando City, La Union and Baguio. The winners were:
Obstacle Challenge: Willie Miller (Alaska Aces)
Shooting Stars Challenge: Jayjay Helterbrand, Dominic Uy and San Fernando City councilor Panding Nince
Trick Shot Challenge: Dennis Miranda (Sta. Lucia Realtors)
Three-point Shootout: Dondon Hontiveros (San Miguel Beermen)
Slam Dunk Competition: Niño Canaleta (Air21 Express)
Legends Shootout: Active players - Willie Miller (Alaska Aces), Dondon Hontiveros (San Miguel Beermen), Gary David (Air21 Express)

Rookie-Sophomore Blitz Game 

Arwind Santos named the game's most valuable player.

All-Star Game 

Jayjay Helterbrand and Willie Miller named the game's co-most valuable players.

Manila Invitational
As part of the warmups for the upcoming FIBA Asia Championship 2007, the PBA invited four national teams taking part in the Asian Championships for the first PBA-Smart Manila Invitational Championships.

Preliminary round

Final

Awards
Most valuable player:  Jimmy Alapag
All-tournament team:
 Jimmy Alapag
 Michael Madanly
 Fadi El Khatib
 Kelly Williams
 Joe Vogel

Awards
Most Valuable Player: Willie Miller (Alaska)
Rookie of the Year: Kelly Williams (Sta. Lucia)
First Mythical Team:
Gary David (Air21)
Willie Miller (Alaska)
Jay Washington (Talk 'N Text)
Kelly Williams (Sta. Lucia)
Dorian Peña (San Miguel)
Second Mythical Team:
Wynne Arboleda (Air21)
Mark Cardona (Talk 'N Text)
Danny Ildefonso (San Miguel)
Arwind Santos (Air21)
Yancy de Ocampo (Talk 'N Text)
All-Defensive Team:
Nelbert Omolon (Sta. Lucia)
Arwind Santos (Air21)
Harvey Carey (Talk 'N Text)
Wynne Arboleda (Air21)
Gary David (Air21)
Most Improved Player: Gary David (Air21)
Sportsmanship Award: Gary David (Air21)
Mr. Energy: Ronald Tubid (Brgy. Ginebra)

Awards given by the PBA Press Corps
 Coach of the Year: Jong Uichico (Barangay Ginebra)
 Mr. Quality Minutes: Chris Calaguio (San Miguel)
 Comeback Player of the Year: Gary David (Air21)
 Referee of the Year: Mario Montiel
All-Rookie Team
LA Tenorio (San Miguel)
Jireh Ibañes (Welcoat)
Jay-R Reyes (Welcoat)
Kelly Williams (Sta. Lucia)
Arwind Santos (Air21)

Cumulative standings

Overall standings

Elimination rounds

Playoffs
Includes one-game playoffs.

Eala's resignation
League commissioner Noli Eala resigned on August 8, 2007, after being disbarred by the Supreme Court on charges infidelity.

References

External links
PBA.ph

 
PBA